Jana Petříková, née Sedláčková (born 21 January 1993) is a former Czech footballer who played as a defender for German 2. Frauen-Bundesliga club FC Carl Zeiss Jena and the Czech Republic women's national team. For most of her career She played for Sparta Prague in the Czech 1st Division and the Champions League.

She was a member of the Czech national team since 2009. She made her debut for the national team on 26 November 2009 in a match against Belgium.

Sedláčková was voted talent of the year at the 2009 Czech Footballer of the Year (women).

Notes

References

External links
 

1993 births
Living people
Czech women's footballers
Czech Republic women's international footballers
Czech expatriate sportspeople in Germany
Expatriate women's footballers in Germany
Czech expatriate women's footballers
FF USV Jena players
Women's association football defenders
Frauen-Bundesliga players
AC Sparta Praha (women) players
Czech Women's First League players
1. FC Lübars players
2. Frauen-Bundesliga players
People from Tábor
Sportspeople from the South Bohemian Region